Arts of Ukraine is a collection of all works of art created during the entire history of Ukraine's development.

Historical development 

The development of art in Ukraine dates back to ancient times.

Types of Ukrainian art 

 Painting
 Graphics
 Sculpture
 Calligraphy
 Theatre
 Music
 Film
 Fiction writing
 Applied arts
 Choreography, dance
 Cinematography
 Fine-art photography
 Television
 Variety and circus art

Ukrainian folk art 

Folk art of Ukraine is a layer of Ukrainian culture associated with the creation of the worldview of the Ukrainian people, its psychology, ethical guidelines, and aesthetic aspirations, covering all types of folk art, traditionally inherent in Ukraine: music, dance, songs, decorative and applied arts, developing as a single complex, and organically included in the life of the people throughout its history.

Art through the ages

Ukrainian art of the Gothic era 

One of the most interesting periods in the history of Ukrainian architecture is the end of the 14th and the first half of the 15th centuries. Many settlers came to Ukrainian cities, mostly Germans, who brought new stylistic forms to art, and in particular to architecture. Painters created frescoes and altarpieces, but the most vivid Gothic paintings were embodied in stained glass, which filled huge openings of windows, and upper floors of chapels.

Ukrainian art of the Renaissance 

The period of the last quarter of the 16th to the first half of the 17th century is called the Renaissance period. In general, the architecture and fine arts of the Renaissance in Ukraine are characterized by the spread of architectural art forms of the Italian Northern Renaissance, the sensation of new acquisitions of European art, and their synthesis with the traditions of Kievan Rus and Ukrainian folk art. New artistic means, techniques were not an end in themselves, but a means to personalize architectural buildings and artistic images of humanistic ideals. The artistic culture of the Renaissance of Ukraine became the basis for the unique Ukrainian Baroque. During the Renaissance, Ukrainian culture in polemical works of art embodied national spiritual values, national ideas, and internally prepared, created, the social atmosphere in which the national liberation war led by Bohdan Khmelnytsky ended with the restoration of the Ukrainian state.

Ukrainian art of the Baroque era 

Details: Ukrainian Baroque

The period of the second half of the 17th to the 18th centuries is called the epoch of old Ukrainian culture, i.e. the one that preceded the new one, created in the last two centuries. The art of that time developed in the Baroque style, which penetrated into all cultural spheres and flourished in the 18th century as the world-famous "Ukrainian Baroque."

Contemporary Ukrainian art 

Contemporary Ukrainian art is represented in its breadth and depth by many art groups. These groups, although following different artistic paths, pursue one goal: to seek a clear expression of Ukrainian art, to deepen its formal values, and to contribute them to the treasury of world art.

Contemporary Ukrainian art is inextricably linked with the West-European course in its development and purpose. Due to the political situation of the Ukrainian people, Ukrainian art was somewhat late in its development during the enslavement by the tsar, but now, with rapid steps, it has crushed everything that was needed for its further evolution.

Impressionism in Ukraine has already given impetus to the work of such brilliant masters of Ukrainian art as Burachek, Vasylkivsky, Izhakevych, Dyachenko, Zamirailo, Zhuk, Krasytsky, V. Krychevsky, F. Krychevsky, Levchenko, Kulchytsky, Murashko, Manievich, Novakivsky, Pymonenko, Sosenko, Samokish, Kholodny, Trush, Shulga, Yaremich, and many others. Their activity in painting practice and in the promotion of Ukrainian art through exhibitions, articles, and pedagogical work laid the foundations for the contemporary work of our artists.

During the activities of these artists, there was a need for art organizations to plan and organize their work and give it organizational shape. And so began the first artistic organization – the Society of Ukrainian Artists in Kyiv, and a similar one in Kharkiv, and later in Lviv.

A new generation of Ukrainian artists has completely changed the artistic situation in Ukrainian lands. The scope of their activities has grown so much that there is a need for ideological art organizations in the artistic sense, and the spread of their activities on a large scale. The pace of artistic life was manifested itself in great acceleration. In fact, a number of such organizations are emerging, with dozens of active members and their diverse artistic activities attracting broad sections of Ukrainian society to art and bringing the achievements of our art far beyond the borders of Ukrainian lands.

The Association of Revolutionary Artists of Ukraine is an organization with purely Ukrainian artistic problems, which, in addition to the practice of European art, united a group of neo-Byzantines at its core, who based their work on the Byzantine art era in Ukraine.

The achievements of this group are very significant, and its stylistic pursuits have left a deep mark in Ukrainian art and have drawn attention to their work in the Western European art world. This group included the following artists: Boychuk, Sedlyar, Padalka, Nalipinska-Boychuk, Azovsky, Sakhnovska, Mizyn, Hvozdyk, Byzyukiv, and others, graphic artists and art critics.

Ukrainian artists working in the form of Western European reality from expressionism to neoclassicism were organized into the Association of Contemporary Artists of Ukraine, which included Taran, Palmiv, Tkachenko, Sadilenko, Kramarenko, Zhdanko, and others as the main representatives.

Close to both of these organizations in an artistic sense is the Association of Independent Ukrainian Artists in Western Ukraine with the following artists: Andrienko, Butovych, Gryshchenko, Glushchenko, Hordynsky, Dolnytska, Yemets, Kovzhun, Osinchuk, Lyaturynska, Muzyka, Selsky, and others.

A large group of artists based on Ukrainian folk art in the broadest sense of the term, which is also adjacent to the Impressionists were united in the "Association of Red Artists of Ukraine" with such names as F. Krychevsky, Mikhailov, Novoselsky, Shovkunenko, Zhuk, Trokhimenko, Kozyk, Korovchinsky, Ivanov, Sirotenko, and others.

These main and leading art organizations with a broad program of activities, include an active artistic element of all areas of art and art journalism, are complemented by a number of smaller organizations that in one form or another spread the framework of art including "Association of Young Artists of Ukraine," "October," "Ukrainian Art Association," "Peace," and the Prague and Paris group of our artists, expand its practice.

Gallery

See also 

 Ukrainian architecture
 Music of Ukraine
 Ukrainian Baroque
 Christian art
 Art history
 Ukrainian culture
 Culture
 Ukrainian underground
 Ukrainian avant-garde

Further reading 

 Начерк історії українського мистецтва / Микола Голубець. — Львів: Накладом фонду «Учітеся, брати мої», 1922. — (Учітеся, брати мої!). Ч. 1 : — 1922 (: З друк. Ставропиг. ін-ту під управою Ю. Сидорака).
 Українське мистецтво: (вступ до історії) / Микола Голубець. — Львів; К. : Накладом вид-ва «Шляхи», 1918. —(Новітня бібліотека; ч. 29).
 Мистецтво старої Руси-України / Ф. І. Шміт. — Х. : Союз, 1919 (: Друк. «Печ. дело»). —(Культурно-історична бібліотека / під ред. Д. І. Багалія).
 Основні риси українського мистецтва / В. Модзалевський ; мал. Павли Діденко. — Чернігів: Друк. Г. М. Веселої, 1918 .
 Антонович Д. Українське мистецтво: Конспективний історичний нарис. — Прага–Берлін, 1923.
 Антонович Д. Скорочений курс історії українського мистецтва. — Прага, 1923.
 Історія українського мистецтва : у 6-х т. / гол. ред. М. Бажан. — К.: УРЕ, 1966–1973.
 Історія українського мистецтва : у 5 т. Т. 1. Мистецтво первісної доби та стародавнього світу / ред.: Р. Михайлова, Р. Забашта; НАН України, Ін-т мистецтвознав., фольклористики та етнології ім. М. Т. Рильського. — К., 2008. — 709 c. —  (Т.1)
 Історія українського мистецтва: у 5 т. Т. 2. Мистецтво середніх віків / ред.: Л. Ганзенко, Р. Забашта, Т. Трегубова; НАН України, Ін-т мистецтвознав., фольклористики та етнології ім. М. Т. Рильського. — К., 2010. — 1293 c. — ISBN 078-966-02-5821-1 (Т. 2)
 Історія українського мистецтва: у 5 т. Т. 3. Мистецтво другої половини ХVI — XVIII століття / ред.: Г. Скрипник, Д. Степовик; НАН України, Ін-т мистецтвознав., фольклористики та етнології ім. М. Т. Рильського. — К., 2011. — 1087 c. —  (Т. 3)
 Історія українського мистецтва: у 5 т. / НАН України, ІМФЕ ім. М. Т. Рильського ; голов. ред. Г. Скрипник ; ред. тому В. Рубан. — К., 2006. — Т. 4 : Мистецтво XIX століття. — 760 с. —  (Т. 4)
 Історія українського мистецтва: у 5 т. / НАН України, ІМФЕ ім. М. Т. Рильського ; голов. ред. Г. Скрипник ; наук. ред. Т. Кара-Васильєва. — К., 2007. — Т. 5 : Мистецтво XX століття. — 1048 с. —  (Т. 5)
 Історія декоративного мистецтва України: у 5 т. Т. 1. Від найдавніших часів до пізнього середньовіччя / ред.: Г. Скрипник; Ін-т мистецтвознав., фольклористики та етнології ім. М. Т. Рильського НАН України. — К., 2010. — 476 c. — Бібліогр.: с. 443—468 . — укp. — 
 Історія декоративного мистецтва України: у 5 т. Т. 2. Мистецтво XVII—XVIII століття / ред.: Г. Скрипник; Ін-т мистецтвознав., фольклористики та етнології ім. М. Т. Рильського НАН України. — К., 2007. — 336 c. — Бібліогр.: с. 311–327. — укp. — 
 Історія декоративного мистецтва України: у 5 т. Т. 3. Мистецтво XIX століття / ред.: Г. Скрипник; Ін-т мистецтвознав., фольклористики та етнології ім. М. Т. Рильського НАН України. — К., 2009. — 346 c. — 
 Історія декоративного мистецтва України: у 5 т. / ІМФЕ ім. М. Т. Рильського НАН України ; голов. ред. Г. Скрипник ; наук. ред. Т. Кара-Васильєва. — К., 2011. — Т. 4 : Народне мистецтво та художні промисли ХХ ст. — 512 с. : іл. — 
 Історія української музичної культури: підручник / Л. П. Корній, Б. О. Сюта. — К. : НМАУ ім. П. І. Чайковського, 2011. — 719 c. — укp.
 Історія української музики: у 6 т. Т. 2. XIX століття / ред.: В. В. Кузик, А. І. Азарова; НАН України, Ін-т мистецтвознав., фольклористики та етнології ім. М. Т. Рильського. — К., 2009. — 798 c. —  (Т. 2)
 Історія української музики: В 6 т. Т. 5. 1941—1958 рр. / М. В. Бєляєва, Т. П. Булат, М. М. Гордійчук, М. П. Загайкевич, А. П. Калениченко; ред.: Г. А. Скрипник; НАН України, Ін-т мистецтвознав., фольклористики та етнології ім. М. Т. Рильського. — К., 2004. — 504 c. — укp. —  (Т. 5)
 Історія української музики: творча діяльність видатних музикантів України кінця ХIХ — другої половини ХХ століть: навч. посіб. / упоряд.: В. В. Бєлікова; Криворіз. держ. пед. ун-т. — Кривий Ріг: Вид. дім, 2008. — 232 c. — укp.
 Історія української музики: навч. посіб. для студ. ф-тів мистецтв вищ. навч. закл. / В. В. Бєлікова; Криворіз. пед. ін-т, ДВНЗ «Криворіз. нац. ун-т». — Кривий Ріг: Видавн. дім, 2011. — 467 c.
 Історія української музики. Від найдавніших часів до першої чверті XIX століття: навч. посіб. для студентів вищ. муз. навч. закл. / С. Й. Лісецький; Київ. ун-т ім. Б. Грінченка. — Київ, 2015. — 147, [1] c. — укp.
 Історія української музики другої половини XIX ст. : навч. посіб. / О. П. Крусь; Рівнен. держ. гуманіт. ун-т, Ін-т мистецтв. — Рівне: НУВГП, 2014. — 225 c. — Бібліогр.: с. 210—212 — укp.
 Історія української музики XX століття: навч. посіб. / О. Є. Верещагіна, Л. П. Холодкова. — 2-ге вид., доповн. — Т. : Астон, 2010. — 279 c. — укp.
 Кара-Васильєва Т., Чегусова З. Декоративне мистецтво України XX століття. У пошуках «великого стилю». — Київ: Либідь, 2005. — 280 с., іл. — 
 Крвавич Д. П., Овсійчук В. А., Черепанова С. О. Українське мистецтво. — Ч. І–ІІІ. — Львів, 2003–2005.
 Львів мистецький (1965—1985 рр.): наука, культура, влада : монографія / Маркіян Нестайко ; НАН України, Львів. нац. наук. б-ка України ім. В. Стефаника, Ін-т українознавства ім. І. Крип'якевича. — Львів : Растр-7, 2017. — 243 с. ; 21 см. — Бібліогр.: с. 198—243 (743 назви). — 
 Музичне мистецтво XXI століття — історія, теорія, практика: зб. наук. пр. Ін-ту муз. мистецтва Дрогоб. держ. пед. ун-ту ім. Івана Франка / упоряд.: А. І. Душний; Дрогоб. держ. пед. ун-т ім. І. Франка, Ін-т муз. мистецтва, Ун-т ім. Яна Кохановського, Ін-т муз. освіти, Ун-т Вітовта Великого, Казах. нац. консерваторія ім. Курмангази. — Дрогобич: Посвіт, 2016. — 287 c.
 Найдавніше мистецтво України = L'art des origines en Ukraine: [монографія] / Л. Яковлева ; [наук. ред Ф. Джінджан ; Ін-т археології НАН України]. — К. : Стародавній Світ, 2013. — 288 с. : іл. — Бібліогр.: с. 250–256. — 
 Нариси музичного мистецтва Галицько-Волинського князівства / Б. Д. Кіндратюк; НАН України. Ін-т українознав. ім. І. Крип'якевича. — Л.; Івано-Франківськ, 2001. — 144 c. — (Історія укр. музики: Дослідж.; Вип. 9).
 Хай М. Музично-інструментальна культура українців (фольклорна традиція) : 2-ге вид., виправл. і допов. — К. ; Дрогобич: Коло, 2011. — 559 с. — 
 Історія українського мистецтва: конспект курсу лекцій / В. Г. Лукань; МОНМС України, Прикарпат. нац. ун-т ім. В. Стефаника, Ін-т мистец. — Т. : Навч. кн. — Богдан, 2012. — 192 c.
 Українське мистецтво XX століття в художній критиці. Теорія. Історія. Практика: монографія / М. О. Криволапов. — 2-ге вид., переробл. і доповн. — К. : КИТ, 2010. — 475 c. — Бібліогр.: 730 назв.
 Українське мистецтво : в 2 т. з додатками / Вадим і Данило Щербаківські ; [передм. І.О. Ходак ; упоряд. О.О. Савчука] ; Інститут археології Національної академії наук України [та ін.]. – Харків : Видавець Савчук О.О., 2015. – 472 с. : іл., портр. 
 Нариси з історії українського мистецтвознавства. Історія українського мистецтва в працях вчених київської школи кінця XIX — початку XX століття: Навч. посіб. / Є. Антонович, І. Удріс; Київ. ін-т реклами, Криворіз. держ. пед. ун-т. — К.; Кривий Ріг: ПП «Вид. дім», 2004. — 273 c.
 Сучасне мистецтво: наук. зб. / Акад. мистец. України, Ін-т пробл. сучас. мистец. — К. : Акта, 2004–. Вип. 8 : — К. : Фенікс. — 2012.
 Сучасне мистецтво: наук. зб. / редкол.: В. Д. Сидоренко (голова) та ін. ; Нац. акад. мистецтв України, Ін-т пробл. сучас. мистец. — К. : Акта, 2004–. Вип. 9 : — К. : Фенікс. — 2013.
 Візуальне мистецтво від авангардних зрушень до новітніх спрямувань: Розвиток візуального мистецтва України ХХ–ХХІ століть / Сидоренко В. Д. ІПСМ АМУ. — К.: ВХ[студіо], 2008. — 188 с.: іл.
 Соціалістичний реалізм і тоталітаризм / Роготченко О. О. ІПСМ АМУ. — К.: Фенікс, 2007. — 608 с.: іл.
 Про мистецтво та художню критику України ХХ століття: Вибрані статті різних років. Кн. І: Формування та розвиток національної мистецької школи і мистецтвознавчої науки в Україні ХХ століття / Криволапов М. О. ІПСМ АМУ. — К.: Видавничий дім А+С, 2006. — 268 с.: іл.
 Проблема людини в українському мистецтві: Навч. посіб. для студ. вищ. навч. закл. / С. О. Черепанова; Ін-т педагогіки і психології професійної освіти АПН України, Львів. наук.-практ. центр. — Л. : Світ, 2001. — 293 c. — Бібліогр.: 90 назв.
 Третє Око: Мистецькі студії (Монографічна збірка статей) / Ольга Петрова. ІПСМ НАМ України. — К.: Фенікс, 2015. — 480 с.: іл., кольор. вкл.: XL с. — 
 Всередині часу: Філософська та мистецтвознавча есеїстка / Упоряд.: Василь Щербак; Редкол.: Ольга Козловська, Іван Кулінський, Андрій Пучков та ін.; ІПСМ НАМ України. — К.: Фенікс, 2013. — 200 с.: іл. — 
 Літопис образотворчих видань. Державний бібліографічний покажчик України / Гол. ред. М. І. Сенченко ; Відп. за вип. Г. О. Гуцол ; Укл. Н. А. Палащина. — К.: Книжкова палата України, 2015. — 301 с. — 
 Кейван І. Українські мистці поза Батьківщиною = Ukrainian artists outside Ukraine. — Едмонт; Монреаль, 1996. — 227 с.
 Soroker Yakov. Ukrainian musical elements in classical music / Edmonton, Toronto: Canadian Institute of Ukrainian Studies Press, 1995. — 155 p.
 Natalia Moussienko. Kyiv Art Space / Woodrow Wilson International Center for Scholars. — Washington, D.C., 2013. — 26 p. —

External links 

  – Library of Ukrainian Art. 
 Електронні версії видань з різних видів і жанрів мистецтва на сайті Національної парламентської бібліотеки України – Digitized publications on art of different types and genres, at the National Parliamentary Library of Ukraine website.
 Сергій Білокінь. Незреалізоване видання Шеститомної історії українського мистецтва (1930—1931) – Sergey Bilokin. Unrealized edition of the Six-Volume History of Ukrainian Art (1930–1931).
  – Sergey Bilokin. In defense of Ukrainian heritage: art historian Fedor Ernst 
  – Khodak I. The concept of the history of Ukrainian art by Danylo Shcherbakivsky

References 

Ukrainian culture
Ukrainian studies
Slavic culture
European culture